The Cambridge Commonwealth, European & International Trust is an organization that offers scholarships to students from overseas and the Commonwealth (excluding the United Kingdom) who have been accepted for admission to the University of Cambridge in England.

On 1 August 2013. the Cambridge Commonwealth Trust and the Cambridge Overseas Trust was merged to form "The Cambridge Commonwealth, European and International Trust". The merged entity continues to provide financial support for international students on degree courses at the University of Cambridge.

Patron & Governance 

The Trust's Patron is the Prince of Wales, and it is governed by a board of Trustees:

 Michael Proctor, Chair and Provost, King's College Cambridge
 Professor John Rallison, Deputy Chair and Fellow, Trinity College, Cambridge
 Professor Dame Ann Dowling, Fellow, Sidney Sussex College, Cambridge
 Professor Simon Franklin, Fellow of Clare College, Cambridge
 Professor Loraine Gelsthorpe, Fellow of Pembroke College, Cambridge
 Mr Peter Phillips, CEO of Cambridge University Press, Fellow of Wolfson College, Cambridge
 Professor Jaideep Prabhu, Judge Business School, Cambridge
 Mrs Ann Puntis, Former CEO of Cambridge International Examinations
 Dr Nidhi Singal, Fellow at Hughes Hall, Cambridge
 Dame Barbara Stocking, President of Murray Edwards College, Cambridge
 Professor Graham Virgo, Pro-Vice-Chancellor for Education, University of Cambridge
 Dr Rowan Williams, Master of Magdalene College, Cambridge

Scholarships 
The trust scholarships usually cover tuition fees with some including living and travel costs. 
All students, regardless of nationalities, are eligible for consideration of the scholarships. 
Scholarships are granted after the students have fulfilled the admissions requirements to the 
University of Cambridge. The types of scholarships include:

 Undergraduate studies
 Graduate (including masters and PhDs)

Applicants are put forward by their respective colleges when admitted and only students who are in financial need
will be considered. Every year, the Trust awards about 400 scholarships to international students to study at
Cambridge. According to DAWN, the country that topped the list of students securing the scholarships is China, followed by the US, and India. Scholars were named as "Cambridge Commonwealth Trust Scholar" in the past. Currently, "Cambridge International Scholar" and "Cambridge Trust Scholar" are used for the awardees.

Alumni 
After many years since its formation, thousands of scholars have benefitted from the financial aid given by the trusts. 
The trust maintains a list of existing scholars and past scholars. It also provides a platform for these scholars to keep in touch and network with each other. The trusts also hold social events for the scholars to meet and interact.

References

External links 
 Cambridge Trust website

Organizations with year of establishment missing
Organisations associated with the University of Cambridge
Scholarships in the United Kingdom